Wei Fulin (born February 1938) is a general (shangjiang) of the People's Liberation Army (PLA). He was a representative of the 13th and 14th National Congress of the Chinese Communist Party. He was a delegate to the 9th National People's Congress and a member of the Standing Committee of the 10 National People's Congress. He was a member of the 15th Central Committee of the Chinese Communist Party.

Biography
Wei was born into a Manchu family in Xinbin County (now Xinbin Manchu Autonomous County), Liaoning, Manchukuo, in February 1938. After graduating from PLA Qiqihar Infantry School in 1958, he was assigned to Shenyang Military Region. In December 1994, he was made commander of Chengdu Military Region, a position he held until August 1995, when he was appointed deputy chief of Joint Staff.

He was promoted to the rank of major general (shaojiang) in 1988, lieutenant general (zhongjiang) in 1993 and general (shangjiang) in 2000.

References

1938 births
Living people
Manchu politicians
People from Xinbin Manchu Autonomous County
People's Liberation Army generals from Liaoning
People's Republic of China politicians from Liaoning
Chinese Communist Party politicians from Liaoning
Commanders of the Chengdu Military Region
Delegates to the 9th National People's Congress
Members of the Standing Committee of the 10th National People's Congress
Members of the 15th Politburo of the Chinese Communist Party